The Coro Revolution, also known as the Colinada Revolution, was an armed insurrection led by General  that occurred in Venezuela between October 1874 and February 1875 against the government of Antonio Guzmán Blanco. The conflict was one of the main armed movements against the dictatorship of Antonio Guzmán Blanco.

The revolution also had the support of the Conservative Party who were defeated during the Federal War. Before the rebellion was suppressed, it came to occupy parts of the Province of Barquisimeto. The most pivotal event of the rebellion was the Battle of Barquisimeto.

Background 
León Colina had been a member of the government of Guzmán Blanco and participated in the War Council against the  rebellion in 1872. However, in 1873 Colina distanced himself from Guzmancism and started a movement against him.

Development 
In October 1874, the Falcón State Legislative Assembly declared war on Antonio Guzmán Blanco, accusing him of being a tyrant.

With the intention of spreading the rebellion throughout the country, León Colina established contact with General José Ignacio Pulido, who until then had been a political ally of Guzmancism. When Guzmán Blanco found out about the rebellion, he commented: "The Revolution has an Army in the West without a general and in the East a general without an Army."

On 20 October 1874 the insurrection broke out. On 27 November 1874, Colina, commanding an army of 3,000 men, attacked the federalist defenders of Barquisimeto, who were commanded by General Rafael Marquez Arana, beginning the Battle of Barquisimeto. The battle lasted three days, leaving a large number of dead and ending in a victory for the forces of the government. The rebels were forced to retreat to Coro with just 1,200 men. In Coro, they were forced to fight an uprising in favor of the government.

Outcome 
León Colina agreed to surrender on 3 February 1875. The victory reinforced the power of President Antonio Guzmán Blanco.

See also 
 History of Venezuela
 April Revolution (Venezuela)

References 

Wars involving Venezuela
1874 in Venezuela
Civil wars involving the states and peoples of South America